The Khetran are a Baloch tribe found primarily in the northeast of the Balochistan province of Pakistan. Their area is a large hilly tract in the Sulaiman Mountains comprising the whole of Barkhan District as well as small parts of neighbouring Kohlu District to the south-west, and Musakhel District to the north. The total population is about 150,000, and at least two-thirds are speakers of the Khetrani language. The are also Khetrans who have settled to the east in the Dera Ghazi Khan District of Punjab; they speak the Saraiki language.

Khetran-Bugti relationships 
In 1845 under the command of Sir Charles James Napier 7,000 men attacked the Bugtis, killing many of them. Khetrans provided sanctuary to hundreds of Bugtis who took refuge in their lands.

In 1847 Sir William attacked the Bugtis with full strength; this time the Bugtis lost 500 fighting men and 120 got arrested. Marris took the opportunity and also attacked the Bugtis, seizing much of their area. The Bugtis went to the Khetran Sardar and asked for his help; that same year a combined attack of Khetrans and Bugtis drove the Marris off, killing more than 70 of their men and taking possession of their cattle.

Struggle against the British 

Both war parties of Khetrans and the Marris attacked Kohlu police station. After looting and then burning it down they attacked a post of Gumband Lavy and also raised it do the ground. All entry points towards the city of Kohlu were sealed off by these war parties.

February 1918, Dera Ghazi Khan District was facing a threat of Khetran and Marri army. On 1 March Khar was attacked. Post office and a rest house was burned down. They also cleaned their hands on some weapons stored in post office. On 5 March they looted the city of Barkhan where government treasury was kept. Khetran army gathered in Rakni and Bawoata and then attacked Border Military burning down three of their posts. On 15 March Khetrans were seen along with Marris inside Fort Minro. That night government buildings and Bungalows were burnt down.

Khetrans, Marris and Bugtis yearly did damage of 25,000 Rupees and of 25 lives.

References 

Social groups of Pakistan
Baloch tribes
Saraiki tribes